The government's official policy is one of nonalignment. In its search for assistance to meet the goal of national reconstruction, the government of Equatorial Guinea has established diplomatic relations with numerous European and Third World countries. Having achieved independence under UN sponsorship, Equatorial Guinea feels a special kinship with that organization. It became the 126th UN member on November 12, 1968. Equatorial Guinea served as a non-permanent member on the United Nations Security Council from 2017 to 2019.

Bilateral relations

Africa

Americas

Asia

Europe

Oceania

See also 
List of diplomatic missions in Equatorial Guinea
List of diplomatic missions of Equatorial Guinea

References

External links
Ministry of Foreign Affairs of Equatorial Guinea
 Embassy of Equatorial Guinea in London, United Kingdom
United States Embassy in Malabo
Honorary Consul of Equatorial Guinea and Investment Opportunities in Bucharest, Romania (Spanish)
 Curriculum Vitae of Equatorial Guinea Foreign Minister H.E. Don Pastor Micha Ondo Bile (Spanish)